Susan Marie Neher (February 22, 1959 – August 2, 2022) was an American actress, active as a child, best known for originating the role of Joanie Cunningham on Happy Days in its first iteration as a segment of the anthology series Love, American Style.  She also played the sister of Bobby Sherman in his one-season series Getting Together as well as the daughter of John Forsythe in the series To Rome With Love.

From the 1980s, Neher, who later used the first name Suzanna, spent considerable time volunteering for a variety of social organizations in and around Pasadena, California, including the Los Angeles Free Clinic and AbilityFirst. Regarding her life, the former child actor stated "I've had the coolest life ever." Neher died in Salem, Oregon on August 2, 2022, at the age of 63.

Filmography

Television series 
1967 Family Affair as Sue Jeanette Minter Episode "Freddie" (S2 Ep.11).
 1968: Family Affair as Lana. Episode "The Latch Key Kid" (S3EP1).
 1969–1971: To Rome With Love as Penny Endicott
 1971–1972: Getting Together as Jennifer Conway
 1972: Love American Style as Joanie Cunningham
 1972–1973: The Partridge Family as Gwen/Girl (two episodes)
 1974: Paul Sand in Friends and Lovers as Audrey Ackerman (one episode)

References

External links
 

1959 births
2022 deaths
21st-century American women
American child actresses
Place of birth missing
American television actresses
Burials at Forest Lawn Memorial Park (Glendale)